The Pini or Nana, or more specifically the Birniridjara, also spelt Piniridjara and  Biniridjara, are an Aboriginal Australian people of Western Australia.

Country
The land took in Erlistoun Creek and Lake Darlot. Their northern frontier ran as far as Wongawol and Princes Range

Alternative names
 Piniiri
 Piniridjara, Biniridjara
 Pandjanu, Bandjanu (a toponym referring to what is known now as Bandya Station)
 Banjanu
 Tjubun
 Madutjara. (Nangatadjara exonym).
 Jabura. (Tjalkadjara exonym meaning "northerners.")
 Birni
 Buranudjara. (?)
 Nangaritjara (Tjalkadjara term for their language)
 Wordako. (apparently indicating the language of the Lake Darlot people).

Notes

Citations

Sources

Aboriginal peoples of Western Australia